The coat of arms of Bosnia and Herzegovina was adopted in 1998, replacing the previous design that had been in use since 1992 when Bosnia and Herzegovina gained independence. It follows the design of the national flag. The three pointed shield is used to symbolize the three major ethnic groups of Bosnia, as well as allude to the shape of the country.

Historic arms
One of the early representations of coats of arms attributed to Bosnia come from the Fojnica Armorial, which was completed in 17th century. The Fojnica arms are shown upon a gold shield, two black ragged staffs are crossed in saltire with two Moor's heads surmounting the upper portion of each staff. Overall is a red escutcheon that was charged with an eight-pointed star and crescent. In the past centuries, European sources have attributed arms to Bosnia that were close or full analogue to this depiction.

The coat of arms of the Kings of Bosnia, who ruled from 1377 until 1463 over the area that is present day Bosnia-Herzegovina and Dalmatia, consisted of a blue shield with six Golden Lilies displayed around a white bend, all within a gold bordure; the Golden Lily is the Lilium bosniacum, which is a native lily to the area. The crest is a plume of peacock feathers that sit within a coronet of lilies. The House of Kotromanić reigned until 1463 when the Ottomans conquered the region, ceasing then the use of the royal coat of arms in Bosnia. The heraldic display of the kings would later be the basis for the arms adopted by the republic in 1992. There are ancient artifacts that suggest that the Lilium bosniacum has been used as a symbol for Bosnia since the 7th century.

After Herzegovina and Bosnia were occupied by the Austrian-Hungarian Empire in 1878, both condominia received arms from the Empire. The heraldic achievement of Stjepan Vukčić Kosača served as inspiration, who was a fifteenth-century nobleman that ruled over the region as Grand Duke of Bosnia and Herzeg of St. Sava. His armorial bearings displayed both a red armoured arm brandishing a sword and a red lion rampant upon a white shield, with two red bars running across the chief. Herzegovina would be given a red shield with a bare arm holding a broken lance for its coat of arms in this same fashion. The coat of arms of Bosnia would be gold with a red armoured arm issuing out of clouds, brandishing a sword. Though both condominia fell under the crown of Hungary, only Bosnia would be included in the greater arms of the Hungarian Kings.

In the nineteenth century, the nationalist movement that had risen against both the former Ottoman rule and contemporary Austro-Hungarian occupation temporarily revived the arms from the Fojnica armorial.

Communist Era

The emblem, along with the flag, of the socialist Republic of Bosnia and Herzegovina was adopted on 31 December 1946. The description of the emblem was similar to the other Yugoslav republics. The device had two crossing stems of wheat in front of scheme of a neighbourhood with two factory chimneys out of which there is smoke. Around the decorative branches and wheat, there is a red track that spirals around. At the top of the emblem is a red star with a golden frame. The red star symbolizes the socialism and communism of Yugoslavia at the time.

The device represents the industry Bosnia and Herzegovina had at the time. The factory chimneys show the industry of several important Bosnian, then Yugoslav, towns and their vital influence towards the economy. All of the Yugoslav republics had similar emblems, but Bosnia and Herzegovina was the only that did not portray nationalistic symbols, representing its multiethnic composition.

The national emblem of the Socialist Republic of Bosnia and Herzegovina was exactly the same as was the previous device of the People's Republic of Bosnia and Herzegovina and defined in its Constitution. This was the first emblem ever in the history of both the regions of Herzegovina and Bosnia that was specific to the entire modern country of Bosnia and Herzegovina.

Modern arms

The coat of arms of the Republic of Bosnia and Herzegovina was adopted on 4 May 1992 and is aesthetically similar to that of the Kotromanić dynasty. It had a blue background divided by a diagonal white line (called bendlet or riband in heraldry). The diagonal white line is supposed to symbolize the sword of Tvrtko and his might as a ruler. The coat of arms was designed in a hurry, right at the beginning of the Bosnian War, which lasted for three years. At the end of the war, there came uproar from the Bosnian Serbs arguing that the coat of arms solely represented Bosniaks. The international community, represented in Bosnia and Herzegovina through the High Representative for Bosnia and Herzegovina, was the instrument to solve the controversy. In early 1998, a commission for the flag change was created and the same year the current coat of arms was adopted in order to help alleviate the tensions among the country's various ethnicities.

Official description
The official description of the coat of arms is as follows:

The coat of arms of Bosnia and Herzegovina is blue and in shape of a shield with a pointed end. In the upper right corner of the shield is located a yellow triangle. Parallel to the left side of the triangle stretches a row of white five-pointed stars.

See also

Coat of arms of Herzeg-Bosnia
Coat of arms of the Federation of Bosnia and Herzegovina, for the sub-national entity's coat of arms
Seal of Republika Srpska, for the sub-national entity's emblem

References

External links
 

 

National symbols of Bosnia and Herzegovina
Bosnia and Herzegovina
Bosnia and Herzegovina
Bosnia and Herzegovina